Åsa Nilla Maria Fischer (born 2 August 1984) is a Swedish footballer for Linköpings. She played in the Swedish national team between 2001 and 2022. She was previously the captain of FC Rosengård.

Career
Fischer won most of her caps for Sweden as a defensive midfielder after her debut versus Norway in January 2001. Approaching a century of appearances, she was converted to a centre back by coach Pia Sundhage in 2013.

The change in position coincided with an upturn in goalscoring form for Fischer, who scored three times for hosts Sweden at UEFA Women's Euro 2013. Her performances in Sweden's run to the semi-finals prompted a contract offer from European Champions VfL Wolfsburg and Fischer agreed to move to Germany from 1 January 2014. In August 2013, the clubs reached a deal for "grateful" Fischer's immediate transfer. Fischer played the first competitive game for her new side in the Bundesliga 2013–14 season opener against Bayern Munich in front of a home crowd of 8,249 fans on 7 September 2013.

On 28 March 2022 Fischer announced through her Instagram that she wouldn’t take part in the fortcoming Team Sweden campaign in UEFA Women's Euro 2022 on grounds that she didn’t want to spend most of the summer away from her family. During the championship she appeared as a studio expert in the broadcasts from Swedish public service channel SVT.

On 27 September 2022, Nilla Fischer announced her retirement from Team Sweden. On 12 December the same year, she announced her retirement from soccer, and instead educate herself to become a police officer.

Matches and goals scored at World Cup and Olympic tournaments
Nilla Fischer has represented Sweden in four World Cups (China 2007, Germany 2011, Canada 2015, France 2019) and three Olympic Games (Beijing 2008, London 2012, Rio 2016.) Her squad finished in third place in two of those World Cups (2011 and 2019), and won a silver medal in Rio.

Twice during Olympic play she scored her team's only goal of the match, securing wins against Argentina in 2008 and South Africa in 2016.

Her 35th-minute goal against the USA on the final day of group play in the 2011 World Cup would prove to be the match winner. That result put Sweden atop their group, and is the only time the Americans have suffered defeat in the group stage of a World Cup.

International goals

Matches and goals scored at European Championship tournaments
Nilla Fischer has appeared at three European Championship tournaments: Finland 2009, Sweden 2013, and Netherlands 2017.

Gender equality and LGBT rights
In regards to women's football, Fischer was described in 2017 as "one of the sport’s most important voices in support of gender equality and LGBT rights".

Personal life
In 2013, Fischer gave an interview to QX magazine in which she announced her intention to marry her partner Mariah-Michaela. They married in December 2013.

Honours

Club

LdB FC Malmö 
 Damallsvenskan:  Winner 2010, 2011
 Svenska Supercupen:  Winner 2011

VfL Wolfsburg 

 UEFA Women's Champions League:  Winner  2013–14
 Bundesliga:  Winner  2013–14, 2016–17, 2017–18, 2018–19
 DFB-Pokal:  Winner  2014–15, 2015–16, 2016–17, 2017–18, 2018–19

Country

Sweden
2007 FIFA Women's World Cup: Group stage
2011 FIFA Women's World Cup: Third place 
2015 FIFA Women's World Cup: Round of 16
2019 FIFA Women's World Cup: Third place 
2008 Summer Olympics in Beijing: Quarter-final
2012 Summer Olympics in London: Quarter-final
2016 Summer Olympics in Rio: Runner-up
UEFA Women's Euro 2009: Quarter-final
UEFA Women's Euro 2013: Semi-finals
Algarve Cup (Participated from 2007 to 2015): Winner 2009

Sweden U19
 UEFA Women's Under-19 Championship: Group stage  2002, Semi-finals 2003
 Nordic Cup: Runner-up 2004 

Sweden U17
 Nordic Cup: Winner 2000, Runner-up 2001

Individual

2013: Silver Boot UEFA Women's European Championship
2013: UEFA Women's European Championship All Star Team
2013: Best female defense in Sweden
2014: Best female defense in Sweden
2014: UEFA Best Women's Player in Europe Award Third place
2016: FIFPro: FIFA FIFPro World XI 2016
 IFFHS World's Woman Team of the Decade 2011–2020
 IFFHS UEFA Woman Team of the Decade 2011–2020

References

Match reports

External links

 
 
 
 Olympic profile
 Profile at VfL Wolfsburg
 

1984 births
Living people
People from Kristianstad Municipality
Swedish women's footballers
Olympic footballers of Sweden
Footballers at the 2008 Summer Olympics
Footballers at the 2012 Summer Olympics
Footballers at the 2016 Summer Olympics
Sweden women's international footballers
2011 FIFA Women's World Cup players
2015 FIFA Women's World Cup players
Kristianstads DFF players
Damallsvenskan players
Linköpings FC players
FC Rosengård players
FIFA Century Club
Swedish LGBT rights activists
Swedish LGBT sportspeople
Lesbian sportswomen
LGBT association football players
VfL Wolfsburg (women) players
Expatriate women's footballers in Germany
Swedish expatriate women's footballers
Swedish expatriate sportspeople in Germany
Women's association football defenders
Women's association football midfielders
Medalists at the 2016 Summer Olympics
Olympic silver medalists for Sweden
Olympic medalists in football
2019 FIFA Women's World Cup players
2007 FIFA Women's World Cup players
Sportspeople from Skåne County
UEFA Women's Euro 2017 players